Sergei Semyonov may refer to:

 Sergey Semyonov (writer) (1868–1922), Russian writer
 Serhiy Semenov (born 1988), Ukrainian biathlete
 Sergey Semenov (wrestler) (born 1995), Russia Greco-Roman wrestler
 Sergey Semenov (footballer) (born 1985), Ukrainian footballer